James Ralph Bauder (born 1969 or 1970) is a Albertan truck driver, the cofounder of Canada Unity and an organizer of the Canada convoy protest.

Career 
Bauder works as a truck driver.

Activism and views 
Bauder was involved in the United We Roll protest in 2019 that protested the Canadian federal government's environmental protection rules. Bauder has shared QAnon, and anti-vaccination views on his social media channels, where he also challenged the official account of New Zealand's Christchurch mosque shootings.

Bauder and his wife Sandra co-founded the Canada Unity group that protested public health measures during the COVID-19 pandemic. The group's Facebook page was registered in late 2019, during the United We Roll movement.

Bauder and less than 100 other protestors drove to Ottawa in October 2021 in a protest they called Convoy for Freedom before he was one of several people who jointly and loosely organised the January 2022 Canada convoy protest. Bauder was arrested in February 2022 as police were ending the Canada convoy protest. He was charged with disobeying a lawful court order, mischief to obstruct property, and obstructing a peace officer. In October 2022, Bauder asked for his scheduled 2023 criminal trial to be moved away from Ottawa.

In November 2022, at the public enquiry into the Canadian government use of the Emergencies Act, Bauder testified that Prime Minister Justin Trudeau was guilty of treason and that God told him to start the convoy. Later that month, Bauder called for a second Freedom Convoy to Ottawa in mid February 2023. Bauder's bail conditions at the time of his call prevent him from visiting the centre of Ottawa.

Personal life 
Bauder lives in Calgary and was 52 years old in 2022. He is married to Sandra Bauder.

See also 

 Pat King
 Christopher John Barber
 Tamara Lich

References 

Year of birth missing (living people)
Living people
Canadian conspiracy theorists
COVID-19 conspiracy theorists
Activists from Alberta
Far-right politics in Canada
Protesters involved in the Canada convoy protest